Trythogga is a hamlet west of Gulval in west Cornwall, England, United Kingdom.

References

Hamlets in Cornwall